Dmitry Arkadyevich Ushakov (born 15 August 1988) is a Russian trampoline gymnast who made his Olympic debut at the 2008 Summer Olympics, finishing in sixth position in the Men's Individual competition. He won the silver medal in trampoline at the 2012 Summer Olympics  At the 2016 Olympics, he finished in 5th place.

Ushakov took up the sport at the age of 7, in Yeysk.  Since 1999, he has been coached by Oleg Zaporozhchenko.  He made his international senior debut in Eindhoven in 2005, where he was part of the Russian team that won team bronze.

After winning silver at London 2012, he was awarded the Order for Merits to the Fatherland, 1st grade.

References

External links
 
 
 

1988 births
Living people
Russian male trampolinists
Olympic gymnasts of Russia
Gymnasts at the 2008 Summer Olympics
Gymnasts at the 2012 Summer Olympics
Gymnasts at the 2016 Summer Olympics
Olympic silver medalists for Russia
Olympic medalists in gymnastics
Medalists at the 2012 Summer Olympics
European Games gold medalists for Russia
European Games medalists in gymnastics
Gymnasts at the 2015 European Games
World Games silver medalists
Competitors at the 2013 World Games
Medalists at the Trampoline Gymnastics World Championships
Gymnasts at the 2020 Summer Olympics
People from Yeysk
Sportspeople from Krasnodar Krai
21st-century Russian people